Let Them Eat Cake is a British sitcom that aired on BBC One in 1999. Starring Dawn French and Jennifer Saunders, it is one of the few programmes in which French and Saunders have both appeared which they did not create themselves.

Plot
It is 1782, seven years before the French Revolution. The most reviled woman in France is the ambitious and immoral Comtesse de Vache, who stalks the halls of the Palace of Versailles, spreading terror into the hearts of her fellow aristocrats by gathering their darkest and most intimate secrets. The Comtesse's servants are her maid, former sex worker Lisette, and her flamboyantly gay couturier, Bouffant. Her constant rival is Madame de Plonge, who is accompanied by her naïve yet sharp-witted daughter, Eveline.

Cast
 Jennifer Saunders as Colombine, Comtesse de Vache
 Dawn French as Lisette
 Adrian Scarborough as Monsieur Bouffant
 Alison Steadman as Madame de Plonge (episodes 1, 2, 4, 6)
 Lucy Punch as Eveline de Plonge (episodes 1, 2, 4, 6)
 Elizabeth Berrington as Marie Antoinette (episodes 1, 4, 6)
 Julian Rhind-Tutt as Marie Antoinette's Advisor (episodes 1, 4, 6)
Linda Spurrier as 1st Aristocratic Woman (episodes 2, 3, 6)
 Maggie Whiting as 2nd Aristocratic Woman (episodes 2, 3, 6)
Steadman was credited as a "special guest star" despite appearing in four of the six episodes.

Guest stars 

 James Greene as the Comte de Vache (episodes 1 & 4)
 Adam James as the Marquis de Bonvie (episode 1)
 Philip Voss as Physician (episode 1)
 Richard E. Grant as Monsieur Vigée-Lebrun (episode 3)
 Maggie Steed as Madame Vigée-Lebrun (episode 3)
 Kathy Burke as Cecile (episode 5)
 Louisa Lytton as Little Girl (episode 5)

Episodes

DVD releases
Let Them Eat Cake was released in Region 2 (UK) and Region 4 (Australia) on 5 March 2007.

References
 Mark Lewisohn, "Radio Times Guide to TV Comedy", BBC Worldwide Ltd, 2003

External links 
 
 

1999 British television series debuts
1999 British television series endings
1990s British sitcoms
BBC television sitcoms
French Revolution films
Period television series
English-language television shows
Television series by Endemol
Television shows set in France
Television series set in the 1780s
Cultural depictions of Marie Antoinette